Franciotto Orsini (1473–1534) was an Italian Roman Catholic cardinal.

Biography
A member of the Orsini family, Franciotto Orsini was born in Rome in 1473, the son of Orso Orsini di Monterotondo and Costanza Savelli. He was a nephew of Pope Leo X on his father's side. Orsini was educated in Florence by Lorenzo de' Medici.

Early in his life, he participated in several military exercises, fighting against the forces of Cesare Borgia. 

Moving to Rome, he became a protonotary apostolic. His uncle Pope Leo X made him a cardinal deacon in the consistory of July 1, 1517. He received the red hat and the deaconry of San Giorgio in Velabro on July 6, 1517.

He was administrator of the see of Nicastro from September 15, 1517 to May 5, 1518. He became archpriest of St. Peter's Basilica in 1520, in succession to Cardinal Ippolito d'Este, who had died on 3 September 1520; Orsini held the post until 1530, when he was succeeded by Cardinal Francesco Corsaro. On January 18, 1519, he was named administrator of the see of Boiano, holding this post until July 24, 1523. He was deposed from the cardinalate on August 8, 1519, though later reinstated. Sometime after 1519, he opted for the deaconry of Santa Maria in Cosmedin.

He participated in both the papal conclave of 1521-22 that elected Pope Adrian VI, and in the papal conclave of 1523 that elected Pope Clement VII.

On June 15, 1524, he became administrator of the see of Fréjus, holding this post until December 15, 1525. He was the administrator of the see of Rimini from March 23, 1528 until April 7, 1529.

Family 
He was married to Violante Orsini di Mugnano and had five legitimate children. After his wife's death, he entered the ecclesiastical estate.

Death 
He died in Rome on January 10, 1534. He is buried in St. Peter's Basilica.

Notes and references

Bibliography
Bazzano, Nicoletta (2013). "ORSINI, Franciotto.". , in: Dizionario Biografico degli Italiani Volume 79 (2013).

1473 births
1534 deaths
16th-century Italian cardinals
Clergy from Rome
Orsini family